Satya Paul was an Indian designer label known for Indian prints founded on 1 April 1985. The brand is now present across India. It was founded by designer Satya Paul and helmed by Sanjay Kapoor (Founder - Genesis Luxury) along with Paul's son Puneet Nanda (Creative Director of Satya Paul till 2010).

The founder of the label, Satya Paul, died in Coimbatore on January 6, 2021.

Products
The Satya Paul product line comprises women's designer wear mostly saris, kurtas, handbags, clutches and scarves, and men's accessories such as neck ties, belts, wallets, pocket squares and cufflinks.

Artists

 Raza 
 Raja Ravi Varma
 Pablo Picasso & René Magritte
 Chola Bronze Collection
 Tarot collection
 World Wide Fund for Nature (WWF)
 Cricket world cup
 Think Pink
 Shloka
 Sumie
 Disney
 S.H. Raza
 Tropical Wonder
 Mata Hari
 Cocktails & Dreams
 Star Struck
 Bohemian Rhapsody
 Rang Brahm & Banaras
 Ramayana
 Indian summer
 Travel Sutra
 Devi

Design Collaborations for a Cause 

Satya Paul joined hands for Women's Cancer Initiative with the Tata Memorial Centre Hospital of Mumbai for the Think Pink-Awareness Campaign for Breast Cancer. The project was the brainchild of Mumbai socialite and philanthropist Devieka Bhojwani, who battled and survived breast cancer.
A special collection, 'Ray of Hope' was developed as well to represent the strength and struggle of women fighting cancer.

In 2006 the brand collaborated with WWF to launch the Endangered Species collection.

In 2003, Satya Paul metamorphosed four of S.H. Raza's paintings and reproduced them as limited edition silk scarves.

References 

Indian fashion
Indian brands
High fashion brands
Companies based in Gurgaon
Indian companies established in 1985
1985 establishments in Haryana